The Djibouti Union for Democracy and Justice is a political party in Djibouti. In the parliamentary election held on 10 January 2003, the party was part of the Union for a Democratic Change (Union pour l'Alternance Démocratique), which won 37.3% of the popular vote but no seats in the National Assembly.

Electoral history

National Assembly elections 

Political parties in Djibouti